A Christmas album is an album of Christmas music.

Christmas Album may refer to:

 Christmas Album (Boney M. album), 1981
 Christmas Album (Herb Alpert album), 1968
 Christmas Album, an album by Burl Ives, 1968
 Christmas Album, an album by Canned Heat, 2007
 A Christmas Album (Amy Grant album), 1983
 A Christmas Album (Barbra Streisand album), 1967
 A Christmas Album (Bright Eyes album), 2002
 A Christmas Album (James Taylor album), 2004
 The Christmas Album (Air Supply album), 1987
 The Christmas Album (Leslie Odom Jr.), 2020
 The Christmas Album (Lynn Anderson album), 1971
 The Christmas Album (Neil Diamond album), 1992
 The Christmas Album (Roberta Flack album), 1997
 The Christmas Album (Human Nature album), 2013
 The Christmas Album, by Aled Jones, 2004
 The Christmas Album (Lee Kernaghan album), 1998
 The Christmas Album (Nitty Gritty Dirt Band album), 1997
 The Christmas Album (The Manhattan Transfer album), 1992
 The Christmas Album (Johnny Mathis album), 2002
 The Christmas Album (Richard & Adam album), 2013
 The Christmas Album (Lea Salonga album), 2001
 The Christmas Album (Stiff Little Fingers album), 1979
 Glee: The Music, The Christmas Album, an album by the cast of the TV series Glee, 2010
 Jackson 5 Christmas Album, 1970
 The Jethro Tull Christmas Album, 2003

See also

 Christmas music
 A Christmas Record, a 1981 compilation LP by ZE Records
 ZE Xmas Record, a 2004 CD version of the 1981 LP A Christmas Record
 The Xmas EP, a 2013 record by Never Shout Never